Agustoni is a village and rural locality (municipality) in La Pampa Province in Argentina.

Population
Agustoni had a population of 268 inhabitants (INDEC, 2001), which represents a 24% increase over the previous population which was at 216 inhabitants (INDEC, 1991) in the previous census.

References

Populated places in La Pampa Province